Akbarpur may refer to:

Bihar
 Akbarpur (community development block), Nawada district

Gujarat 
 Akbarpur, Paliganj, village in Patan district

Punjab 
 Akbarpur Khurd, a village under the Shahkot development block of Jalandhar district
 Akbarpur Kalan, a village in Shahkot in the Jalandhar district
 Akbarpur, Bhulath, a village in Bhulath Tehsil in Kapurthala district
 Akbarpur, Kapurthala, a village located in Kapurthala district

Rajasthan 
 Akbarpur, a village in Hindaun Block

Uttar Pradesh 
 Akbarpur, Ambedkar Nagar, a city and municipal board in Ambedkar Nagar district
 Akbarpur (Assembly constituency)
 Akbarpur Airport
 Akbarpur Junction railway station
 Akbarpur, Kanpur Dehat, a town and municipality in Kanpur Dehat district
 Akbarpur-Raniya (Vidhan Sabha constituency)
 Akbarpur (Lok Sabha constituency), a parliamentary constituency in Uttar Pradesh
 Akbarpur, Agra, a village in Agra district
 Akbarpur (meteorite), a meteorite which fell in 1838 in Uttar Pradesh, India